John Mackenzie, Lord MacLeod (17272 April 1789) was a Scottish Jacobite politician and soldier of fortune.

Life
Born at Castle Leod near Strathpeffer, Scotland, he was the eldest son of George Mackenzie, 3rd Earl of Cromartie and Isabel Gordon. He was a Freemason, his father being the Grand Master, Grand Lodge of Scotland in 1737-38. He married Margery, daughter of James Forbes, 16th Lord Forbes.
 
Mackenzie was styled Lord MacLeod in 1731. Sailing to join the rebel army on board the sloop Hound, he fought with his father's clan at the Battle of Falkirk, leading the Cromartie's Regiment of about 500 clansmen in the Jacobite rising of 1745 during which he was taken prisoner, with his father and 218 others, on 15 April 1746 at Dunrobin Castle, by a party of the William Sutherland, 17th Earl of Sutherland's militia the day before the Battle of Culloden, in the last siege fought on the mainland of Great Britain. On 20 December 1746 he was not brought to trial before the Commissioners, though he pleaded guilty to high treason, but received full pardon on 26 January 1748 on condition "that within six months of his 21st birthday he would convey to the Crown all his rights in the Earldom" which was not restored until the reign of Queen Victoria. He would later write The Memorials of John Murray of Broughton: sometime secretary to Prince Charles. Narrative by John Mackenzie, Lord Macleod eldest son of the Earl of Cromartie., the only other person not to stand trial for treason and pardoned.

Leaving Scotland, Mackenzie initially lived in Berlin with Field Marshal Keith, who assisted him in obtaining a commission in the Swedish Army in 1750. Receiving financial assistance to equip himself for service from Georges de Boulogne, on the recommendation of Lord George Murray, he entered service in Swedish Pomerania as a mercenary. Described by Lord George as "a young man of real merit", he was expected to gain promotion in the service of the Swedish King. This expectation was realized during his service to the Crown of Sweden for twenty-seven years with distinction, obtaining the rank of Lieutenant-General, and subsequently being decorated with the award of Commander, Order of the Sword of Sweden. 

During the Seven Years' War he joined the Prussian Army as a volunteer, serving through the second campaign of 1757. Created a Count of Sweden he returned to Scotland in 1771 and was the first Colonel of the 73rd Foot (MacLeod's Highlanders, 71st Foot) from 1772, and then 1st Battalion, The Highland Light Infantry in 1777. 

On 9 December 1778 his Swedish title was recognised by King George III. From 1779 he served with his regiment in the East Indies Campaign against Hyder Ali, joining the army under Major-General Sir Hector Munro assembled at St. Thomas Mount, Madras, in July 1780. Although he wasn't with the battalion at the time, it was completely destroyed during the Battle of Conjeveram on 10 September 1780. Following disagreement with Major-General Munro on the loss of the battle, John Mackenzie returned to Scotland, but remained the regiment's Colonel until his death. He was promoted to Major-General in 1784.

Returning to Scotland John Mackenzie settled in Ross-shire where he entered politics holding the office of Member of Parliament (Tory) between 1780 and 1784. 

Promoted to the rank of Major-General in 1782, he regained his family estates in 1784, restored to him by Act of Parliament, for a payment of £19,010 for debts on the estates. He spent the rest of his life on the estate which he greatly improved, planting thousands of trees, and building a new mansion, Tarbat House.

John Mackenzie died in Edinburgh on 2 April 1789 following a year of illness, without descendants and was buried at the Canongate Kirkyard, Edinburgh. The grave lies immediately to the right (east) upon entering the churchyard. His estates passed to his cousin, Kenneth Mackenzie.

References

Sources
 G.E. Cokayne; with Vicary Gibbs, H.A. Doubleday, Geoffrey H. White, Duncan Warrand and Lord Howard de Walden, editors, The Complete Peerage of England, Scotland, Ireland, Great Britain and the United Kingdom, Extant, Extinct or Dormant, new ed., 13 volumes in 14 (1910–1959; reprint in 6 volumes, Gloucester, U.K.: Alan Sutton Publishing, 2000), volume III, page 546.
 Charles Mosley, editor, Burke's Peerage, Baronetage & Knightage, 107th edition, 3 volumes (Wilmington, Delaware, U.S.A.: Burke's Peerage (Genealogical Books) Ltd, 2003), volume 1, page 979.

|-

1727 births
1789 deaths
People from Ross and Cromarty
Clan Macleod
Members of the Parliament of Great Britain for Scottish constituencies
British MPs 1780–1784
Commanders of the Order of the Sword
Burials at the Canongate Kirkyard
British Army generals
Scottish mercenaries
Scottish Jacobites
Scottish biographers
Swedish generals
People from Swedish Pomerania
British military personnel of the Second Anglo-Mysore War
Jacobite military personnel of the Jacobite rising of 1745
Prussian Army personnel
71st Highlanders officers